Allium moschatum is a Eurasian species of wild onion with a range extending from Spain to Iran.

Allium moschatum is a bulb-forming perennial. Flowers are born in umbels on top of thin, wiry scapes rarely more than 15 cm tall; tepals white with a thin but prominent purple midvein.

It usually grows in clearings of bushes, dry pastures and stony environments.

Formerly included
 Allium moschatum var. brevipedunculatum, now called Allium korolkowii 
 Allium moschatum var. dubium, now called Allium korolkowii

References

moschatum
Flora of Europe
Garden plants
Plants described in 1753
Taxa named by Carl Linnaeus